Carasobarbus sublimus is a species of ray-finned fish in the genus Carasobarbus. It is endemic to the River Tigris in Iraq.

References 
 

Carasobarbus
Fish described in 1997